Events during the year 1115 in Italy

Deaths
 Matilda of Tuscany

Births
 William V, Marquess of Montferrat
 Welf VI

References 

Years of the 11th century in Italy
Italy
Italy